Frida Toveby (born 1982) is a Swedish handball player. She played for the club Aalborg DH and for the Swedish national team. She participated at the 2008 Summer Olympics in China, where the Swedish team placed eight.

Toveby has since retired and is now a full-time lawyer.

References

External links

1982 births
Living people
Swedish female handball players
Handball players at the 2008 Summer Olympics
Olympic handball players of Sweden